Dahan Institute of Technology (DAHAN) is a private university located in Xincheng District, Hualien County, Taiwan.

Dahan Institute of Technology offers a range of undergraduate and graduate programs in areas such as electrical engineering, mechanical engineering, civil engineering, electronic engineering, computer science, design, and management. The institute also offers doctoral programs in engineering and design.

History
DAHAN was founded in June 1977 as Dahan Junior College of Engineering and Business. On 1 August 1999, the college was renamed Dahan Institute of Technology.

Faculty
 College of Industry
 College of Management
 College of Tourism
 General Education

Transportation
The school is accessible within walking distance North East of Beipu Station of the Taiwan Railways.

See also
 List of universities in Taiwan

External links
 

1977 establishments in Taiwan
Educational institutions established in 1977
Universities and colleges in Hualien County